Neonomius ovalis is a species of ground beetle in the family Carabidae. It is found in Australia.

References

Psydrinae